Yamchi (also Romanized as Yāmchī) is a city in Yamchi District of Marand County, East Azerbaijan province, Iran. At the 2006 census, its population was 9,320 in 2,301 households. The following census in 2011 counted 9,832 people in 2,915 households. The latest census in 2016 showed a population of 10,392 people in 3,208 households.

References 

Marand County

Cities in East Azerbaijan Province

Populated places in East Azerbaijan Province

Populated places in Marand County